Robert Bernard Waley-Cohen DL (born 10 November 1948 in Westminster, London) is an English entrepreneur.

Biography
He is the son of Bernard Waley-Cohen and Joyce Waley-Cohen, and grandson of Sir Robert Waley Cohen and Harry Nathan, 1st Baron Nathan. He was educated at Eton College.

He is the founder of Alliance Medical and was chairman of Cheltenham racecourse until 3 May 2019.

He was appointed as a Deputy Lieutenant of the County of Warwickshire on 16 August 2016.

His horse, Noble Yeats, won the 2022 Grand National, ridden by his son Sam Waley-Cohen, an amateur hunt jockey riding in his last race. His youngest son, Thomas, died of cancer in 2004.

References

1948 births
Living people
English Jews
Deputy Lieutenants of Warwickshire
English company founders
People educated at Eton College
Businesspeople in the health care industry
British racehorse owners and breeders
Younger sons of baronets
Waley-Cohen family